Captain Lawrence Brewing Company is a craft brewery located in Elmsford, New York.  The brewery is owned and run by head brewer Scott Vaccaro. Vaccaro, a homebrewer since 1995, trained in brewing science at UC Davis.

Many of Captain Lawrence's beers are strongly influenced by traditional Belgian ale styles, although often with an American twist. Barrel-aging and ales with sourness or flavors contributed by bacteria and wild yeasts such as Brettanomyces, are also part of their repertoire.

Like many small breweries, Captain Lawrence seeks to be environmentally sensitive, including donating its spent grain to a local farmer for use as cattle feed. 

Their beers are fermented in stainless steel cylindro-conical vessels.

The brewery takes its name from Captain Lawrence Drive in South Salem, New York, the road on which Vaccaro's childhood home is located. The street is named after Samuel Lawrence (1733–1796), a captain in the Westchester County Militia, 3rd Regiment, during the American Revolution.

History 
Vaccaro brewed his first beer before he was legally allowed to drink.  As a teenager in high school he saw a friend's father brewing beer at home, asked if he could participate, and was told it would be allowed with parental permission.  

After enrolling at Villanova University to study accounting, Vaccaro realized his real desire was to become a professional brewer.  He transferred to UC Davis and studied fermentation science. He interned at Adnams Brewery in the UK. Following graduation he worked at Sierra Nevada and the short-lived Colorado Brewery in Danbury, Connecticut.

Captain Lawrence Brewing Company was founded in 2006. Its first brewery was located on Castleton Street in Pleasantville, New York and had a 20-barrel system.  After five years, needing more space to operate a bottling line and a larger system to increase capacity, the brewery was relocated to Elmsford, New York, approximately five miles from the original brewery.  The new facility has a 40-barrel brewing system and more fermentation capacity.  There is also a small seven-barrel system for experimental and specialty batches.  The new brewery began operation in 2011. In February of 2012, they opened a tasting room at the brewery in Elmsford.  In 2014, they added a sour ale production wing to their brewery that they call the Fermento Funk Facility.  They have nine oak foudres, five large rounds, and hundreds of wine barrels.  The Elmsford brewery expanded to 33,000 square feet and opened a full service restaurant in May of 2019.  

In October of 2020, Captain Lawrence opened the Mt Kisco Barrel House in Mount Kisco, NY.  In addition to serving beer, this location is also used for barrel storage and blending of both beer and spirits.

Beers

Year 'round brews
 Citra Dreams (7.0% ABV) IPA New England with Citra hops, this smooth drinking hazy IPA bursts with orange, grapefruit and resin

 Freshchester (5.6% ABV) - Pale Ale
 Liquid Gold (6.5% ABV) -  Belgian style Blonde Ale, made with Belgian ale yeast and coriander
 Brown Bird Ale (4.8% ABV) - American Brown Ale
 Smoked Porter (8.0% ABV) - American porter made with German smoked malt
 Captain’s Reserve Double IPA (9.0% ABV) - version of the contemporary American "double" or extra strong India Pale Ale style
 Captain's Kölsch (5.5% ABV) - Kölsch, first brewed in Spring 2010

Seasonal and specialty offerings
 Fudgie the Beer (6.0% ABV) - a stout flavored with Carvel "chocolate crunchies" as found in their "Fudgie the Whale" dessert cake 
 Frost Monster (11.0% ABV) - malty, intense ale, available aged in rum barrels
 Xtra Gold (10.0% ABV) - strong golden ale in the Belgian Abbey Tripel style, but flavored with American hop varieties including Amarillo
 Golden Delicious (10.0%+ ABV) - American Tripel, aged in oak apple brandy barrels
 Imperial Smoked Porter (12.0% ABV) - strong porter made with German smoked malt
 Smoke from the Oak (ABV not listed) - strong smoked porter that has been released in several different barrel-aged versions
 Nor'easter Winter Warmer (11.0% ABV) - strong dark ale in the Belgian tradition, flavored with elderberries
 St. Vincent's Dubbel (8.0% ABV) - richly flavored malty brown ale in the Belgian Abbey Dubbel style
 Cuvée De Castleton (8.0% ABV) - American "wild ale", fermented with Muscat grapes and Brettanomyces (GABF Gold Medal Winner for American-Style Sour Ale in 2007)
 Rosso e Marrone (ABV not listed) - American sour ale, fermented with grapes and aged in oak barrels; "Rosso e Marrone" is Italian for "Red and Brown"; BeerAdvocate lists this beer as a Flanders Oud Bruin
 Birra DeCicco (6.0% ABV) - described on the label as a "malt beverage brewed with chestnut honey and jam"; this limited release was a collaboration with DeCicco & Sons, a family grocery chain in Westchester County, New York that has an extensive selection of craft and microbrew beers
 Pumpkin Ale (5.5% ABV) -  amber ale, brewed with pumpkin and pumpkin spices
 Espresso Stout -  stout, brewed with espresso coffee
 Five Years Later (10.0% ABV) - brewed to celebrate the brewery's fifth anniversary, a strong almost-black ale brewed with five varieties of malt and five different hops
 Winter Rye (5.0% ABV) - a one-time beer brewed using organic rye and crystal malt from Valley Malting Co in Massachusetts; brewed with a German yeast strain and lightly dry hopped with US Goldings
 Katchkie Harvest Ale - collaboration between Captain Lawrence Brewery, Executive Chef Robb Garceau of Great Performances and Katchkie Farm; Captain Lawrence Brewery's first farm-to-table beer offering

See also
 Barrel-aged beer

References

External links
 Captain Lawrence listing on RateBeer
 Captain Lawrence listing on BeerAdvocate

Beer brewing companies based in New York (state)